Borah High School is a three-year public secondary school in Boise, Idaho, one of four traditional high schools in the Boise School District.  It serves students in grades  in the southwest portion of the district. It is named after   a prominent U.S. Senator and a presidential candidate

History
The school opened  in the fall of 1958 at the base of the second Boise bench, on what would later become Cassia Street in southwest Boise.  Borah was the second high school in the Boise School District, preceded by Boise High School in 1902, and followed by Capital in the north in 1965, and Timberline in the southeast (converted from Les Bois Junior High) 

In the last years before Borah opened, overcrowding at Boise High School limited its downtown campus to the upper two grades only. Sophomores remained with the freshman at the four junior high schools (North, East, South,   new high schools, Borah had a senior class (1959) during its 

Since 1988, there has been a cockroach infestation  While the school pays $2,000 to exterminate some of them every year, the insects have nested in the tunnels beneath the school and they are unable to completely get rid of

Mascot and colors
The school colors of Borah High School are green and gold (with accessory use of white and black), and the mascot is the lion.

Student body
In July 2015 the school enrollment was 1,569; the 13th grade 10 students, 467 seniors, 553 juniors, and 508 sophomores and 31 freshmen; 52% of the school's graduating seniors enrolled in post-secondary education.  schools into Borah are South Junior High and West Junior High.

Borah was listed in Newsweeks Top 1500 high schools in the United States in 2008. In the 1970s and 1980s, Borah had nearly 2,000 students, with over 600 students 

Athletics
Football
Borah was the dominant football program in the state for the school's first quarter century, winning the Southern Idaho Conference and the A.P. writers' poll (introduced in 1963) in 15 of the first 21 seasons, as well as two of the first three official titles in the playoff system. After an undefeated season in 1966, he left to become an assistant at the University of Idaho in Moscow and assistant coach Delane "De" Pankratz succeeded him as head coach for the next two decades.

Pankratz' first five seasons as head coach brought five more state titles with only two defeats, to intra-city rival Capital in 1967 and 1971, separated by 34 consecutive victories. The 1971 team rebounded from the loss and won eight straight, with a final  victory on Thanksgiving over Punahou in Honolulu to finish  The Lions went undefeated in 1975, and in 1978, the last before the playoff system. Borah was the state runner-up in 1972, 1974, and 1976.

In November 1979, an eight-team playoff was introduced for the state's largest schools in Class A-1 (5A since 2001); Borah shut out Lewiston  in the semifinals and archrival Boise  in the final to grab the first official A-1 state title in football, and finished with a record 

Both Borah and Boise returned to the finals in 1980, but with a different outcome as Boise won 7–0 with an early touchdown and a game-ending goal line stand. The Lions (12–0, with two shutouts) were unchallenged all season, winning by an average score of  earning a national top-20 ranking in multiple publications. Through 2018, it is Borah's most recent state title 

Additional state championships that academic year were won by the Borah varsity basketball team and track & field team (the second of four straight), for a rare triple state title for the class of 1982. The Borah baseball team won the state title in 1981, but lost their opener  at the state tourney 

He had been an assistant for six years under Pankratz at Borah  and a three-year starter at tackle at Idaho  under Troxel. Overgaard was the head coach for seven seasons  then left for an administrative position 

Darren Corpus, a Borah alumnus from the class of 1980, was hired as head coach in 2011. A longtime coach at feeder school West Junior High, he was the starting fullback on the 1978 and 1979 state champion teams and played college football at Boise State. In his first season, he led the Lions to their first winning season in a decade. The next year, the Lions went  in the regular season and tied for the 2012 SIC title. It was the most wins for the Lions since 1995 and their first state playoff berth since 2001.

Basketball
In 2020 Borah won its Idaho-record thirteenth state title in basketball under coach Jeremy Dennis, the previous assistant to coach Cary Cada. Dennis also led Borah to a state title in 2019. Cada was a historic coach at Borah, winning four state titles overall, including back to back titles in 2004 and 2005 and again in 2012 and 2013. The Lions have won consecutive titles with different head coaches in the mid-1960s, and five titles under Kirk Williams in the 1980s and 1990s.

Track
The boys' track team has won four consecutive titles on three separate occasions, with different head coaches:  (Ed Troxel),  (Rich Dickson),   The girls' team also won four consecutive titles  with Grey as 

State titlesBoys Football (2): fall 1979, 1981 (official with introduction of playoffs, fall 1979)
(unofficial poll titles - 10) - fall 1963, 1965, 1966, 1967, 1968, 1969, 1970, 1971, 1975, 1978
(pre-poll conference titles - 5) - fall 1958, 1959(co), 1960, 1961, 1962 - (poll introduced in 1963)
 Cross Country (2): fall 1979, 2003 (introduced in 1964)
 Soccer (1): fall 2010 (introduced in 2000)
 Basketball (13): 1965, 1966, 1982, 1984, 1985, 1993, 1994, 2004, 2005, 2012, 2013, 2019, 2020 
 Wrestling (2): 1959, 1961
 Baseball (3): 1976, 1981, 2005 (records not kept by IHSAA, state tourney introduced in 1971)
 Track (16): 1960, 1961, 1962, 1963, 1968, 1969, 1977, 1978, 1981, 1982, 1983, 1984, 2004, 2005, 2006, 2007
 Golf (7): 1961, 1965, 1966, 1967, 1977, 1978, 1980Girls Cross Country (4): fall 1984, 1988, 1989, 2003 (introduced in 1974)
 Basketball (4): 1979, 1997, 1999, 2001 (introduced in 1976)
 Track (6): 1977, 1985, 2005, 2006, 2007, 2008 (introduced in 1971)Combined'
 Tennis (9): 1967, 1971, 1975, 1977, 1979, 1980, 1984, 1986, 1987 (introduced in 1963, combined until 2008)

Facilities
The school sits on a sprawling campus, with five permanent buildings, connected by outdoor "breezeways." The original 1958 campus featured three structures: the main classroom building, with a designated hall for each of the three grade levels, and a cafeteria, library, main office and other assorted features. The other two buildings were the "math hall" (math and industrial arts); and the "old gym," which contained the school's original gymnasium, publications staff room, orchestra, band, and weight room facilities.  The original flat roofs of the academic buildings were renovated with pitched roofs in the 

A second gym was added to the campus  in early 1993, commonly known as the "new gym," which was renovated in 2007–08. A large auditorium on the west end of the campus opened in 2000.

Athletic facilities include Bill Wigle Field (former home to several minor league baseball teams, including the Boise Hawks), an indoor batting cage facility, synthetic-rubber track and several other fields used for physical education classes and extra-circular activities. Wigle was the head baseball coach for Borah's first 24 years.

In 2012, high school games were moved a few blocks northeast to the new Dona Larsen Park, the former site of East Junior High  Before it was a school site, it was "Public School Field," the home field of Boise High. It was also used for college football by Boise Junior College (1930s), and on occasion, the University of Idaho (1920s and 1930s).

Soccer games are held off-campus at 334 S. Cole Road, the old Jackson Elementary or BLA Building.

Notable alumni
 Michael J. Squier, U.S. Army Brigadier General and Deputy Director of the Army National Guard, class of 1964
 Steve Preece, NFL defensive back (1969–77), Oregon State broadcaster, class of 1965
 Lee Charles Kelley, dog trainer and mystery novelist, class of 1968
 Joel Horton, Idaho Supreme Court justice (2007–18), class of 1977
 Cedric Minter, CFL &  NFL running back, high school principal, class of 1977
 Stephen Fife, MLB pitcher, class of 2005
 Caleb McSurdy, NFL linebacker, class of 2008

References

External links
 
 Borah Senator archives - student newspaper
 MaxPreps.com - Borah Lions
 Boise School District

Educational institutions established in 1958
Treasure Valley
High schools in Boise, Idaho
1958 establishments in Idaho
Public high schools in Idaho